Journey Home is the second studio album from Will to Power, released in 1990 by the label Epic Records. The album peaked at No. 178 on the Billboard 200 in the United States.

Three singles were released from the album. The first, "I'm Not in Love" (a cover of the 10cc song) reached the top 10 on the Billboard Hot 100. The second, "Boogie Nights" (a cover of the Heatwave song) failed to chart. The final single, "Fly Bird", was released only in the Netherlands, where it reached No. 60 on the MegaCharts. Q Magazine characterised it as 'plodding power balladry".

Track listing

Charts

References

1990 albums
Will to Power (band) albums